Fushan may refer to:

Fushan, Chengmai County (福山镇), a town in Hainan, China
Fushan County (浮山县), of Linfen, Shanxi, China
Fushan District (福山区), Yantai, Shandong, China
Fushan, Ningyang County (伏山镇), a town in Ningyang County, Shandong, China
Fushan, Weifang (符山镇), a town in Weicheng District, Weifang, Shandong, China
Fushan, Iran, a village in Razavi Khorasan Province, Iran